Cosmin Gârleanu (born 7 February 1989 in Galaţi, Romania) is a Romanian footballer who plays for Liga III club Avântul Valea Mărului.

External links
 Profile at otelul-galati.ro 
 
 

1989 births
Living people
Sportspeople from Galați
Romanian footballers
Association football midfielders
ASC Oțelul Galați players
AFC Dacia Unirea Brăila players
FCM Dunărea Galați players
FC Petrolul Ploiești players
FC Delta Dobrogea Tulcea players
Liga I players
Liga II players